Eggers is a surname. Notable people with the surname include:

Alfred J. Eggers (1922–2006), senior NASA administrator
Bartholomeus Eggers (c.1637–1692), Flemish sculptor active in the Dutch Republic
Dave Eggers (born 1970), American writer, editor and publisher
Doug Eggers (born 1930), American football player
Frank H. Eggers (1901–1954), American politician
Graydon Eggers, American football coach
Hans Jürgen Eggers (1906–1975), German historian, eponymous of his Eggers chronology of the Roman imperial era
Henrik Franz Alexander von Eggers (1844–1903), Danish soldier and botanist
Jeff Eggers, American Navy SEAL, author, and security advisor
Jens G. Eggers, British physicist
Kira Eggers (born 1974), Danish model
Kurt Eggers (1905–1943), German war correspondent and writer
Otto Reinhold Eggers (1882–1964), American architect in the firm Eggers & Higgins
Paul Eggers (1919–2013), Texas politician
Per Eggers (born 1951), Swedish actor
Peter Eggers (born 1980), Swedish actor
Reinhold Eggers (1890–1974), German security officer at Colditz Castle
Robert Eggers (born 1983), American screenwriter and director
William D. Eggers (born 1967), American writer, government reform consultant

See also
Egger (surname)

German-language surnames
Dutch-language surnames
Patronymic surnames